is a Japanese animation studio founded by Osamu Tezuka in 1968. It is known for animating notable works such as Marvelous Melmo, the 1980 and 2003 Astro Boy series, and Black Jack. It is also the holder of the intellectual property of Tezuka's works; his son, Makoto Tezuka, currently aims to use the company to extend Tezuka's manga series with new issues and publish posthumous works such as Legend of the Forest.

Their logo is a blue silhouette of Astro Boy's head as a mascot.

History
In 1961, Osamu Tezuka established Osamu Tezuka Mushi Production as a video and animation production unit. It was officially incorporated as Mushi Productions Co., Ltd., the following year. Tezuka served as acting director of the company until 1968, when he left to start another animation studio, Tezuka Productions Co., Ltd., as a spun-off division of Mushi Productions dedicated to manga production and copyright management.

In 1970, Tezuka moved the headquarters of Tezuka Productions to the second and third floors of a cafe business across from Fujimidai Station in Nerima. The second floor was reserved for employee offices and production assistants, while the third floor was Tezuka's own workspace and office. For the first few years, the studio took sub-contracted animation work from Mushi Production, which included a variety of animated shorts and a full television series, Fushigi na Merumo (Marvelous Melmo), which was broadcast by TBS for 26 episodes from October 1971 to March 1972. After Mushi Production filed for bankruptcy in 1973, Tezuka Productions took on animation production full-time along with its manga and copyright businesses and began growing rapidly as an animation studio.

From 1980 to 1981, Tezuka Productions produced a remake for Astro Boy that ran for 52 episodes on Nippon TV. Tezuka had been dissatisfied with the first Astro Boy series produced at Mushi Production, and had wanted to create a remake for the series since 1974.

In 2007, Tezuka Productions began a multi-year project to digitize and color all of Tezuka's published manga series, comprising over 150,000 pages. Tezuka's former personal assistants reproduced the color charts that they originally used for all-color pieces while Tezuka was still producing series, in order to ensure that the new coloring process remained faithful to the colors used in Tezuka's time.

In 2008, Tezuka's son, Makoto, announced that he would complete Legend of the Forest, his father's final unfinished work, at Tezuka Productions. The film was completed in 2014, premiering at the 2014 Hiroshima International Animation Festival in August, and in North America at the Japan Society in New York City on February 21, 2015.

Works

Television series
Marvelous Melmo (October 3, 1971 – March 26, 1972)
Astro Boy (October 1, 1980 - December 23, 1981)
Don Dracula (April 5, 1982 – April 26, 1982)
Blue Blink (April 7, 1989 – March 16, 1990)
The New Adventures of Kimba The White Lion (October 12, 1989 – October 11, 1990)
The Three-Eyed One (October 18, 1990 – September 26, 1991)
Dear Brother (July 14, 1991 - May 31, 1992)
In the Beginning: The Bible Stories (April 1, 1997 – May 9, 1997)
Hakugei: Legend of the Moby Dick (April 2, 1997 – May 12, 1999, from episodes 19–26)
Astro Boy (April 6, 2003 - March 28, 2004)
Phoenix (March 21, 2004 – May 4, 2004)
Black Jack (October 11, 2004 - March 6, 2006)
Black Jack 21 (April 10, 2006 - September 4, 2006)
Mokke (October 3, 2007 – March 25, 2008)
Genji Monogatari Sennenki (January 15, 2009 – March 26, 2009)
Kids on the Slope (April 12, 2012 – June 28, 2012) - co-produced with MAPPA
Little Astro Boy (March 22, 2014 – April 26, 2014)
Samurai Warriors (January 11, 2015 – March 29, 2015) - co-produced with TYO Animations
Young Black Jack (October 1, 2015 – December 17, 2015)
Dagashi Kashi 2 (January 12, 2018 – March 30, 2018)
Dororo (January 7, 2019 – June 24, 2019) - co-produced with MAPPA
Go Astro Boy Go! (October 3, 2019 – October 1, 2020)
The Quintessential Quintuplets (January 9, 2019 – March 28, 2019)
Adachi and Shimamura (October 9, 2020 – December 25, 2020)
How Not to Summon a Demon Lord Ω (April 9, 2021 – June 11, 2021) - co-produced with Okuruto Noboru; Tezuka Productions animated episodes 1, 3–6, and 8–10.
Girlfriend, Girlfriend (July 3, 2021 – September 18, 2021)
Muteking the Dancing Hero (October 3, 2021 – December 19, 2021) - co-produced with Tatsunoko Production
The Dawn of the Witch (April 8, 2022 – July 1, 2022)
Mamekichi Mameko NEET no Nichijō (October 3, 2022)
Endo and Kobayashi Live! The Latest on Tsundere Villainess Lieselotte (January 7, 2023)
My Home Hero (April 2, 2023)
The Café Terrace and Its Goddesses (April 8, 2023)
Under Ninja (October 2023)
Astro Boy Reboot (TBA)

Specials
Okazaki City in 70 Years (March 21 - May 17, 1987)
Brave Fire S09 (April 29, 1987)
Tezuka Osamu Academy Grand Prize (December 31, 1999)
The Last Mystery of the 20th Century (December 5, 2000)
Black Jack: The 4 Miracles of Life (December 22, 2003)

Films
 Once Upon a Time (March 15, 1970) - short film
 Misuke in the Land of Ice (July 1970) - short film
 Misuke in Southern (August 1971) - short film
 Thumbelina (March 18, 1978) - co-produced with Toei Animation
 One Million-Year Trip: Bander Book (August 27, 1978)
 Unico: Black Cloud, White Feather (April 5, 1979) - short film
 Undersea Super Train: Marine Express (August 26, 1979)
 Phoenix 2772 (March 15, 1980)
 Fumoon (August 31, 1980)
 The Fantastic Adventures of Unico (March 14, 1981) - co-produced with Sanrio and Madhouse
 Bremen 4: Angels in Hell (August 23, 1981)
 Unico in the Island of Magic (July 16, 1983) - co-produced with Sanrio and Madhouse
 A Time Slip of 10,000 Years: Prime Rose (August 21, 1983)
 Jumping (June 1984) - experimental film
 Bagi, the Monster of Mighty Nature (August 19, 1984)
 Broken Down Film (August 15, 1985) - experimental film
 Galaxy Investigation 2100: Border Planet (August 24, 1986)
 Phoenix: Karma Chapter (December 20, 1986) - co-produced with Madhouse
 Push (August 21, 1987) - experimental film
 Muramasa (August 21, 1987) - experimental film
 Legend of the Forest, Part I (December 18, 1987) - experimental film
 Self-Portrait (June 1988) - experimental film
 The Tezuka Osamu Story: I Am Son-goku (August 27, 1989)
 Black Jack: The Movie (November 30, 1996)
 Black Jack: Capital Transfer to Haien (1996) - short film
 Jungle Emperor Leo (August 1, 1997)
 My Son Goku (July 12, 2003)
 Astro Boy: Mighty Atom - Visitor of 100,000 Light Years, IGZA (September 1, 2005)
 Black Jack: The Two Doctors of Darkness (December 17, 2005)
 Dr. Pinoko's Forest Adventure (December 17, 2005) - short film
 Jungle Emperor: The Brave Can Change the Future (September 5, 2009)
 Buddha (May 28, 2011) - co-produced with Toei Animation
 The Life of Budori Gusuko (July 7, 2012)
 Buddha 2 (February 8, 2014) - co-produced with Toei Animation
 My Tyrano: Together, Forever (December 10, 2021)
 My Tyrano II: Easter, Garden (April 25, 2025)
 Pluto (TBA)

Original video animations
Lion Books (October 10, 1983 - July 16, 1993)
Love Position - The Legend of Halley (December 16, 1985)
Phoenix: Yamato Chapter  (August 1, 1987) - co-produced with Madhouse
Phoenix: Space Chapter (December 21, 1987) - co-produced with Madhouse
Symphonic Poem: Jungle Emperor Leo (April 1, 1991)
Ambassador Magma (February 21, 1993 - June 21, 1993)
Golgo 13: Queen Bee (May 21, 1998)
Black Jack (December 12, 1996 - December 16, 2011)
Black Jack: The Boy Who Came from the Sky (March 22, 2000)
Ravex in Tezuka World (November 7, 2009)
The Prince of Tennis: Best Games!! (August 24, 2018 - present)

Original net animations
Black Jack (2001)
Pluto (2023; upcoming) - co-produced with Genco

Video games
Astro Boy: Omega Factor (2003)
Astro Boy (2004)
Blood Will Tell: Tezuka Osamu's Dororo (2004)
Astro Boy: The Video Game (2009)
Astro Boy: Tap Tap Rush (2011)
Astro Boy Dash (2013)

See also
 Makoto Tezuka
 Osamu Tezuka
 Mushi Production
 List of Osamu Tezuka anime
 List of Osamu Tezuka manga
 Osamu Tezuka's Star System

References

External links
  
 

 
Japanese companies established in 1968
Animation studios in Tokyo
Japanese animation studios
Mass media in Niiza, Saitama
Mass media companies established in 1968
Osamu Tezuka